The National Highway 65 or the N-65 is one of Pakistan National Highway running from Sukkur in Sindh to Quetta in Baluchistan, Pakistan via Shikarpur, Jacobabad, Jaffarabad and Nasirabad. It is a two lane highways with total length of 385 km, divided into 295 km in Baluchistan and the remaining 90 km in the Sindh It is maintained and operated by Pakistan's National Highway Authority.

See also 
 Motorways of Pakistan
 Transport in Pakistan

References

External links
 National Highway Authority

Roads in Pakistan